Henri Michel Couttet (8 June 1901 – 11 October 1953) was a French ice hockey player. He competed in the men's tournament at the 1920 Summer Olympics.

References

External links
 

1901 births
1953 deaths
Ice hockey players at the 1920 Summer Olympics
Olympic ice hockey players of France
People from Chamonix
Sportspeople from Haute-Savoie